William Snow (sometimes Snowe) was the inaugural Dean of Bristol.

The last Prior of Bradenstoke, Snow was granted a Crown pension on 24 April 1539 and was Dean from 1542-51.

References

Deans of Bristol
15th-century Christian monks